The following is a list of roads, streets, and major thoroughfares in Amman, Jordan.

Roads and streets

Circle Street is officially known as Zahran Street. Seven of west Amman's eight main traffic circles are on Zahran Street.

Airport Road is officially known as  Queen Alia International Airport Street. It passes through the Prince Talal bin Muhammad Square, continues on from the airport to form the main highway connecting the south of Jordan.

Mecca Street is officially known as  Mecca Al-Mukarrameh Street, and runs parallel to Zahran Street west-to-east.

Medina Street runs from between the Prince Rashid bin el-Hassan Square and Prince Talal bin Muhammad Square towards University Road.

Mango Street  is officially known as  Omar bin al-Khattab Street and is in Jabal Amman.

Rainbow Street is officially known as  Abu Baker al-Siddeeq Street, and runs up and down Jabal Amman.

Gardens Street  is officially known as Wasfi Al-Tal Street and runs between Shmeisani and Tl'aa Al Ali towards Khalda.

Wakalat Street is a pedestrianized street in the Swefiyeh shopping district.

Abdullah Ghosheh Street connects Mecca Street to Airport Road.

Embassy Road is officially known as Queen Zein Al Sharaf Street, and connects Airport Road to the US Embassy and others in Abdoun.

Al Qahirah Street bisects Abdoun Circle west-east.

Shmesani Culture Street is also known as Skateboard Street.

Circles

The 1st Circle is the first of a series of eight large traffic circles interspersed east-to-west on Zahran Street. The roundabout is located in the older part of the Jordanian capital on Jabal Amman at the beginning of Rainbow Street.

The 2nd Circle is the second of the series. The roundabout is located in the older part of the Jordanian capital.

The 3rd Circle  is surrounded by  hotels, notably the Le Royal Hotel and the Intercontinental Hotel.  Restaurants in the vicinity include Romero's, located halfway between the 3rd and 2nd Circles. The Lebanese restaurant Argeelah is also close by. Located inside the Hyatt Hotel is the Italian-themed Incontro restaurant. The 3rd Circle is located in the Shmeisani neighborhood of Amman. The 3rd Circle is also known as King Talal Square.

The 4th Circle is best known of being the place where the Jordanian prime ministry compound is located (also known locally as the "4th circle"). It connects to the Abdoun Bridge which crosses Wadi Abdoun. The circle is becoming part of a project to link North Amman with the Airport Road. The circle is nearby numerous embassies, including the Egyptian, Algerian, French, Spanish, and Tunisian embassies.

The 5th Circle, officially named Prince Faisal bin al-Hussein Square, is a traffic circle in the heart of the hotel district in Amman. Hotels in the vicinity of the 5th Circle include the Four Seasons, the Sheraton Amman Hotel, the Bristol Signature Hotel, and many others.  Also close to the 5th Circle is the Arab Medical Center hospital, one of the leading medical centers in Jordan that serves as a referral hospital for the Middle East and surrounding area. In 2020 the 5th circle was replaced by traffic lights

 The 6th Circle connect the seven Ammanian hills, called "the jabals" by English-speaking visitors, after the Arabic jabal meaning hill or mountain. The 6th Circle's official name is Prince Rashid bin el-Hassan Square.  It links together the Umm Uthayna and Sweifiyah districts. It is near numerous hotels as well as the Jordan Gate Towers project. In 2020 the 6th circle was replaced by traffic lights.

The 7th circle is officially called Prince Talal bin Muhammad Square, it is noted for having a large green turf area surrounding a large monument. There is a Royal Jordanian city terminal at the circle, where customers can check in a day before their flights. In 2014 the 7th circle was replaced by traffic lights.

The 8th Circle is the last of the series of traffic circles interspersed east-to-west and is located in the newer part of the Jordanian capital. It connects the urban parts of west Amman to the industrial city, As-Sena'ah.

See also
 List of tallest buildings in Amman

References

Transport in Amman
Amman
Roads in Jordan
Streets in Amman
Jordan transport-related lists